The 54th Ohio Infantry Regiment was an infantry regiment in the Union Army during the American Civil War.  They wore Zouave uniforms that were identical to those of the 34th Ohio Infantry Regiment (Piatts Zouaves.)

Service
The 54th Ohio Infantry Regiment was organized at Camp Dennison near Cincinnati, Ohio, in October 1861 and mustered in for three years service under the command of Colonel Thomas Kilby Smith as a Zouave regiment.  The regiment was recruited in Allen, Auglaize, Champaign, Clinton, Cuyahoga, Fayette, Greene, Highland, Lake, Logan, Morgan, and Preble counties. 

The regiment was attached to District of Paducah, Kentucky, to March 1862. 2nd Brigade, 5th Division, Army of the Tennessee, to May 1862. 1st Brigade, 5th Division, Army of the Tennessee, to July 1862. 1st Brigade, 5th Division, District of Memphis, Tennessee, to November 1862. 1st Brigade, 5th Division, District of Memphis, Tennessee, Right Wing, XIII Corps, Department of the Tennessee, November 1862. 1st Brigade, 2nd Division, Right Wing, XIII Corps, to December 1862. 2nd Brigade, 2nd Division, Sherman's Yazoo Expedition, to January 1863. 2nd Brigade, 2nd Division, XV Corps, Army of the Tennessee, to July 1865. Department of Arkansas to August 1865.

The 54th Ohio Infantry mustered out of service on August 15, 1865, in Little Rock, Arkansas.

Detailed service

1862

 Left Ohio for Paducah, Ky., February 17, 1862. 
 Moved from Paducah to Savannah, Tenn., March 6–12, 1862. 
 Expedition to Yellow Creek, Miss., and occupation of Pittsburg Landing, Tenn., March 14–17. 
 Battle of Shiloh, Tenn., April 6–7. 
 Advance on and siege of Corinth, Miss., April 29-May 30. 
 Russell's House, near Corinth, May 17. 
 March to Memphis, Tenn., via LaGrange, Grand Junction and Holly Springs, June 1-July 21. 
 Duty at Memphis until November. 
 Expedition from Memphis to Coldwater and Hermando, Miss., September 8–13. 
 Grant's Central Mississippi Campaign, "Tallahatchie March," November 26-December 13. 
 Sherman's Yazoo Expedition December 20, 1862, to January 3, 1863. 
 Chickasaw Bayou December 26–28, 1862. 
 Chickasaw Bluff December 29.

1863

 Expedition to Arkansas Post, Ark., January 3–10, 1863. 
 Assault and capture of Fort Hindman, Arkansas Post, January 10–11. 
 Moved to Young's Point, La., January 17–21, and duty there until March. 
 Expedition up Rolling Fork via Muddy, Steele's and Black Bayous and Deer Creek, March 14–27. 
 Demonstrations on Haines and Drumgould's Bluffs April 29-May 2. Moved to join army in rear of Vicksburg, Miss., May 2–14, via Richmond and Grand Gulf. 
 Battle of Champion Hill May 16. 
 Siege of Vicksburg, Miss., May 18-July 4. 
 Assaults on Vicksburg May 19 and 22. 
 Advance on Jackson, Miss., July 4–10. 
 Siege of Jackson, Miss., July 10–17. 
 Camp at Big Black until September 26. 
 Moved to Memphis, Tenn., then march to Chattanooga, Tenn., September 26-November 21. 
 Operations on Memphis & Charleston Railroad in Alabama October 20–29. 
 Bear Creek, Tuscumbia, October 27. 
 Chattanooga-Ringgold Campaign November 23–27. 
 Tunnel Hill November 23–24. 
 Missionary Ridge November 25. 
 Pursuit to Graysville November 26–27. 
 March to relief of Knoxville November 28-December 8.
 March to Chattanooga, Tenn., then to Bridgeport, Ala., Bellefonte, Ala., and Larkinsville, Ala., December 13–31.

1864
 Duty at Larkinsville, Ala., to May 1, 1864. 
 Expedition toward Rome, Ga., January 25-February 5. 
 Atlanta Campaign May 1 to September 8. 
 Demonstration on Resaca May 8–13. 
 Near Resaca May 13. 
 Battle of Resaca May 14–15. 
 Movements on Dallas May 18–25. 
 Operations on line of Pumpkin Vine Creek and battles about Dallas, New Hope Church and Allatoona Hills May 25-June 5. 
 Operations about Marietta and against Kennesaw Mountain June 10-July 2. 
 Assault on Kennesaw June 27. 
 Nickajack Creek July 2–5. 
 Chattahoochie River July 6–17. 
 Battle of Atlanta July 22. 
 Siege of Atlanta July 22-August 25. 
 Ezra Chapel, Hood's 2nd sortie, July 28. 
 Flank movement on Jonesboro August 25–30. 
 Battle of Jonesboro August 31-September 1. 
 Lovejoy's Station September 2–6. 
 Operations in northern Georgia and northern Alabama against Hood September 29-November 3. 
 March to the sea November 15-December 10. 
 Siege of Savannah December 10–21. 
 Fort McAllister December 13.

1865
 Campaign of the Carolinas January to April 1865. 
 Salkehatchie Swamps, S.C., February 2–5. 
 Cannon's Bridge, South Edisto River, February 9. 
 North Edisto River, February 11–13. 
 Columbia February 16–17. 
 Battle of Bentonville, N.C., March 20–21. 
 Occupation of Goldsboro March 24. 
 Advance on Raleigh April 10–14. 
 Bennett's House April 26. 
 Surrender of Johnston and his army. 
 March to Washington, D.C., via Richmond, Va., April 29-May 19. 
 Grand Review of the Armies May 24. 
 Moved to Louisville, Ky., June 2, thence to Little Rock, Ark., and duty there until August.

Casualties
The regiment lost a total of 233 men during service; 4 officers and 83 enlisted men killed or mortally wounded, 3 officers and 143 enlisted men died of disease.

Commanders
 Colonel Thomas Kilby Smith - promoted
 Colonel Cyrus W. Fisher
 Lieutenant Colonel James A. Farden - commanded at the Battle of Shiloh after Col Smith succeeded to brigade command
 Major Robert Williams Jr. - commanded at the Battle of Missionary Ridge

Notable members
 Private Henry G. Buhrman, Company E - Medal of Honor — Participating in a diversionary "forlorn hope" attack on Confederate defenses, May 22, 1863.
 Sergeant James Jardine, Company F - Medal of Honor  — Participating in the same "forlorn hope."
 Private David Jones, Company C - Medal of Honor  — Participating in the same "forlorn hope."
 Private Edward McGinn, Company K - Medal of Honor  — Participating in the same "forlorn hope."
 Private Jacob Swegheimer, Company I - Medal of Honor  — Participating in the same "forlorn hope."
 Private Edward Welsh, Company D - Medal of Honor  — Participating in the same "forlorn hope."

See also
 List of Ohio Civil War units
 Ohio in the Civil War

Notes

References

External links
 Ohio in the Civil War: 54th Ohio Volunteer Infantry by Larry Stevens
 Regimental flag of the 54th Ohio Infantry
A Forlorn Hope
Vicksburg Medal of Honor Recipients

Military units and formations established in 1861
Military units and formations disestablished in 1865
Units and formations of the Union Army from Ohio
1861 establishments in Ohio